Faxonius marchandi, the Mammoth Spring crayfish, is a species of crayfish in the family Cambaridae. It is endemic to the United States.

References

External links

Cambaridae
Fauna of the United States
Freshwater crustaceans of North America
Crustaceans described in 1948
Taxa named by Horton H. Hobbs Jr.
Taxobox binomials not recognized by IUCN